Jens Fiedler (born 15 February 1970) is a German triple Olympic champion and multiple world champion track cyclist. He retired from competitive cycling in early 2005.

Major results 

1992
 1st Olympic Games, Sprint
 1st National Championship, Sprint
1993
 1st National Championship, Sprint
1994
 1st National Championship, Sprint
1995
 1st National Championship, Sprint
 1st World Championship, Team sprint (with Michael Hübner, Jan van Eijden)
1996
 1st Olympic Games, Sprint
 1st National Championship, Sprint
1997
 2nd World Championship, Sprint
1998
 1st National Championship, Sprint
 1st World Championship, Keirin
 2nd World Championship, Sprint
1999
 1st National Championship, Team sprint (with Jan van Eijden, Eyk Pokorny)
 1st National Championship, Sprint
 1st World Championship, Keirin
2000
 1st National Championship, Team sprint (with Jan van Eijden, Carsten Bergemann)
 3rd Olympic Games, Sprint
 3rd Olympic Games, Keirin
 2nd World Championship, Keirin
2001
 1st National Championship, Team sprint (with Sören Yves Lausberg, Eyk Pokorny)
 3rd World Championship, Keirin
2002
 1st National Championship, Keirin
 1st National Championship, Sprint
 1st National Championship, Team sprint (with Stefan Nimke, Carsten Bergemann)
 3rd World Championship, Team sprint
2003
 2nd National Championship, Team sprint (with Stefan Nimke, Carsten Bergemann)
 1st World Championship, Team sprint (with René Wolff, Carsten Bergemann)
2004
 1st National Championship, Team sprint (with Stefan Nimke, Carsten Bergemann)
 1st Olympic Games, Team sprint (with Stefan Nimke, René Wolff)

Personal and professional
For many years Fiedler has lived in Chemnitz.   He is trained as an electrician, and currently works for the city's power supply company.   He lives with his third wife.

Since 2009 he has also been the manager of the UCI Track Team, "Erdgas".

References 

1970 births
Living people
People from Dohna
People from Bezirk Dresden
German track cyclists
German male cyclists
Cyclists from Saxony
Olympic cyclists of Germany
Cyclists at the 1992 Summer Olympics
Cyclists at the 1996 Summer Olympics
Cyclists at the 2000 Summer Olympics
Cyclists at the 2004 Summer Olympics
Olympic medalists in cycling
UCI Track Cycling World Champions (men)
Medalists at the 2004 Summer Olympics
Medalists at the 2000 Summer Olympics
Medalists at the 1996 Summer Olympics
Medalists at the 1992 Summer Olympics
Olympic gold medalists for Germany
Olympic bronze medalists for Germany
Recipients of the Silver Laurel Leaf